Tracy Chamoun (born on 22 October 1960) is a Lebanese author, diplomat and political activist of Lebanese and Australian descent. She was the Lebanese ambassador to Jordan from August 2017 until 7 August 2020 when she resigned after the 2020 Beirut explosions, saying the catastrophe showed the need for a change in leadership.

Early life 
Tracy Chamoun was born in 22 October 1960 to the Chamoun political family. She is one of two surviving children of Dany Chamoun, the assassinated former leader of the National Liberal Party and son of former President Camille Chamoun; her mother is the late Patti Morgan Chamoun, an Australian fashion model and actress. Her 2 brothers died at a young age, alongside Dany Chamoun, in their house, in an operation executed by Lebanese Forces Christian Militia headed by Samir Geagea.

Career

Dany Chamoun Foundation
Through the Dany Chamoun Foundation, Tracy Chamoun has sought to perpetuate the legacy of her father, who, on 21 October 1990, was assassinated together with his second wife and two children. Many received amnesty. Eleven associates are also sentenced. Her autobiography, Au Nom du Pere, centered on her relationship with her father and his life and work. In it, she recounts the harrowing experience in which she and her mother were kidnapped in 1980 during a surprise attack on the National Liberal Party headquarters by Phalangist militiamen under the command of Bachir Gemayel, her father's former ally.

Syrian occupation
Chamoun was an outspoken critic of the former Syrian occupation of Lebanon. She has described her country's independence as a "myth". Before the Independence Day celebrations in 1990 she asked rhetorically:
To what extent does the establishment believe that the population is so blind that it cannot see that the nation is far from independent? Like the myth of the emperor with no clothes, it is a charade that only the sycophants see and celebrate.

Political views
Chamoun is known for her moderate political views. She became the first woman to found a political party in the Arab world, called the "Liberal Democrats Party of Lebanon" (also translated as the Party of Liberal Democrats of Lebanon). She favors the building of a modern democracy, and has spoken out against what she sees as the feudal political system in which clan loyalties often play a more significant role than ideology in politics.

Chamoun has vowed to continue to remind people of the truth behind the assassination of her slain father which she writes about in her books Le Sang De la Paix published by Lattes in France and  published by Antoine in Lebanon.

Candidacy for presidency
On 29 August 2022, she announced her candidacy for presidency in the 2022 presidential election.

See also
 Samir Geagea

References

External links

Further reading
"Declaration on the anniversary of Dany Chamoun’s assassination", October 2008, Tayyar.org
"Warlord gets life, but plans his vacation" Robert Fisk, The Independent, 25 June 1995

1960 births
Living people
Lebanese Maronites
Lebanese people of Australian descent
National Liberal Party (Lebanon) politicians
21st-century Lebanese women politicians
21st-century Lebanese politicians
Chamoun family
Ambassadors of Lebanon to Jordan
Lebanese women ambassadors
Lebanese memoirists
Lebanese women memoirists
Candidates for President of Lebanon